The Carter Glaciers are in Glacier National Park in the U.S. state of Montana. The Carter Glaciers consist of between three and four separate small glacial remnants (glacierets), none of which  meet the threshold of  often cited as being the minimum size to qualify as an active glacier.

See also
 List of glaciers in the United States
 Glaciers in Glacier National Park (U.S.)

References

Glaciers of Glacier County, Montana
Glaciers of Glacier National Park (U.S.)
Glaciers of Montana